The Hall of Presidents is an attraction located in Liberty Square at the Magic Kingdom at Walt Disney World. The attraction is a multi-media presentation featuring Audio-Animatronic figures of all 45 individuals who have served as President of the United States. It opened on October 1, 1971, along with the rest of the Magic Kingdom, housed in a building resembling Philadelphia's Independence Hall. A short film is presented for the first portion of the show, with Abraham Lincoln reciting the Gettysburg Address. A stage presentation of all the presidents in Audio-Animatronic form follows the short film, with George Washington reciting a speech, before the incumbent president of the United States recites the oath of office. It was also the final project Disney Legend Ub Iwerks worked on.

History

One Nation Under God
Walt Disney had originally wanted an attraction similar to the "Hall of Presidents" called One Nation Under God at Disneyland in Anaheim, California. After Disneyland had become a huge success, Disney proposed an extension of Main Street, U.S.A. called Liberty Street at Edison Square. Disney originally wanted wax figures of all the U.S. presidents, and later decided to try to make them animated figures, but the technology that he wanted for this attraction did not exist or fully meet his desire. Disney decided to collaborate with his fellow Imagineers of WED Enterprises to try to make the first Audio-Animatronic figure in a human form, and it would be one of Disney's heroes: Abraham Lincoln, the 16th president of the United States.

Great Moments with Mr. Lincoln

Disney and his Imagineers created an Audio-Animatronic figure of Abraham Lincoln, more advanced than the ones produced for the Illinois Pavilion at the 1964-1965 New York World's Fair. The show consisted of a pre-show film on a screen with a depiction of paintings done to represent Illinois. Guests then entered the main theater where the theater curtains eventually were removed to reveal the figure of Abraham Lincoln sitting in a chair. He rose out of the chair, stood up, and gave an oratory, lasting five to seven minutes, consisting of a collection of his famous speeches. The show concluded with more theater curtains revealing the Rotunda of the United States Capitol Building. While the original version of the show that played in New York during its showing at the Fair was eventually dismantled and demolished, a similar version was created even while the Fair was going on in 1965. Great Moments with Mr. Lincoln was closed down for Disneyland's 50th anniversary in 2005 but re-opened in 2009.

Liberty Square
After Disney's death on December 15, 1966, plans were moving ahead for the Walt Disney World Resort in Lake Buena Vista, Florida. Since there was going to be another Disneyland-style theme park, this time officially known as the Magic Kingdom, Imagineers felt that one of the changes that would differ between Disneyland and the Magic Kingdom should be in one of the themed lands. The Imagineers decided that since Florida was closer to the real New Orleans in Louisiana, having a New Orleans Square in the Magic Kingdom was a bit superfluous. The old designs and concepts for Disney's Liberty Street at Edison Square were reviewed, revised, and what became of it was the Magic Kingdom's Liberty Square, that served as the alternative to New Orleans Square. Liberty Square also serves as the alternative location for the Magic Kingdom's version of the Haunted Mansion, which is in New Orleans Square in Disneyland. The Imagineers also thought that, as a follow-up to Great Moments with Mr. Lincoln, they could finally create Disney's concept of "One Nation Under God", and thus the creating the Hall of Presidents.

The attraction
The show begins with a film presentation of the history of the United States of America. It shows that the American way was forged through conflict and many long years of struggle. The main idea of the film is that the United States is not free from improvements. It is certain changes that prove necessary over the years. The film also celebrates the liberties of the American people, the United States Constitution, and the progress of America in its early years.

Original version (1971–1993)

With the help of paintings from the era, the Philadelphia Convention is reenacted. George Washington and Benjamin Franklin are heard making speeches to the Convention. They assured all that this government was going to be different. After the formation of the Constitution, the first test of the new republic was the Whiskey Rebellion, which proved that the government would use force to "ensure domestic tranquility." Years later, President Andrew Jackson was the first to deal with secession by the Southern states. Luckily, the talk was quelled and Jackson escaped the threat.

The film then segues to the time of Abraham Lincoln, when secession was a real threat; these paintings and vocal performances are similar, if not identical, to the same segment in Great Moments with Mr. Lincoln. The American Civil War portion of the presentation is based on the Great Moments with Mr. Lincoln presentation, including a nearly identical script, although, to fit the much bigger screen of the theater, rather than the much smaller one at Disneyland, new paintings were required to fill the screen. The Constitution survived the conflict, making America a truly unified nation.

A huge era of progress occurred after the war. All the while, the Constitution remained the tent pole of the country. The film then turns toward the future, saying that the leaders of tomorrow have to be committed to the Constitution and its principles, if the country is to survive. A Saturn V rocket takes off, and the screens then lift up, and the U.S. presidents take center stage. After the curtain lifts, all presidents are called, in chronological order.

Each one responds to their name with a nod, wave, or other sign of acknowledgment. During the presentation, the presidents fidget, talk to each other, and look around; all the while making the illusion seem quite real. Abraham Lincoln then stands and takes center stage. His speech is remarkably similar to the speech he gave in Great Moments with Mr. Lincoln. After his speech, the show concludes with a rendition of "The Battle Hymn of the Republic," (the same rendition used in "Great Moments with Mr. Lincoln"). However, in 2009, the Battle Hymn of the Republic was replaced with America the Beautiful, but it reverted to "The Battle Hymn of the Republic" in 2011.

Clinton administration (1993–2001)
The original show remained virtually unchanged from 1971 until October 1993. Additional Audio-Animatronic figures of Gerald R. Ford, Jimmy Carter, Ronald Reagan, and George H. W. Bush were then added when each entered into office. Lawrence Dobkin continued to be the narrator, and re-recorded the roll-call for each new addition. The only major feature that changed before 1993 was the original adaptation of "The Battle Hymn of the Republic" that served as part of the finale of the show. It was the same adaptation used in Great Moments with Mr. Lincoln. The adaptation was done in a lower key, and instead changed for a revised adaptation in a higher key.

The show closed in early September 1993 and was then completely renovated and re-opened in October 1993, after Bill Clinton had been elected to office. The changes to the show, which in some form remained until early 2017, are credited to Eric Foner, a history professor at Columbia University. He persuaded various Disney executives, most notably then-Disney CEO Michael Eisner, that a new adaptation of the show was needed. Foner is responsible for completely rewriting and changing the script of the show in order to focus more on slavery and other ethical and civil related issues in the United States of America. He is also responsible for rewriting Lincoln's speech, which was originally nearly identical to that which Lincoln gave in the original version of Great Moments with Mr. Lincoln. Clinton also became the first president to provide his voice to recite a speech for his audio-animatronic figure; every president after him has followed the same as they have entered office, with the exception of Joe Biden, who did not record remarks.  Every president since Barack Obama has also provided their voice to recite the presidential oath of office.

While the format of the show remained in the sense of the photos, films, and other features used in the film and elsewhere in the presentation, the speed at which the films played, and what was shown on them was redone to fit the changed script. A new music score was also introduced.

Also, prominent members of The Walt Disney Company would no longer narrate parts of the film. Instead, Maya Angelou narrated the revised script and gave the roll-call of the presidents. New amateur actors gave the voices of the characters in the film. Another feature that was added in 1993 was a speech given by the incumbent president. Foner is responsible for writing the speech which President Clinton himself recorded at the White House. Followed by the incumbent president's speech, Abraham Lincoln would give the completely revised speech written by Foner. The Lincoln Audio-Animatronic figure was also given eyeglasses, and held a piece of paper to glance to and from his speech. Some objected to this, saying that it dumbed down the depiction of Lincoln as a prominent and iconic figure. During the 1993 refurbishment of the attraction, Royal Dano, who was the original voice of Lincoln for The Hall of Presidents and Great Moments with Mr. Lincoln at the World's Fair and early versions of the attraction at Disneyland, had become ill and was not able to record Lincoln's revised speech. Instead, voice actor Peter Renaday was tasked to voice Abraham Lincoln. Renaday also served as a narrator on The Walt Disney Story version of Great Moments with Mr. Lincoln and provided the narration for the Magic Kingdom's Tomorrowland Transit Authority PeopleMover from 1994 to 2009.

Bush administration (2001–2009)
For the 2001 update to the show, adding President George W. Bush and his speech, actor J. D. Hall replaced Angelou as the narrator, but he read from the same script as the 1993 version. The Audio-Animatronic figure created for Clinton in 1993 was moved and a new Bush figure was added.

Obama administration (2009–2017)

The Hall of Presidents closed October 31, 2008, prior to the general elections, to undergo an extensive renovation to upgrade its audio and visual effects and systems as well as the addition of the next president. After his election and inauguration, President Barack Obama recorded his speech for attraction on March 4, 2009, he also recorded himself once again reciting the oath of office of the president of the United States. Walt Disney Imagineering recorded Obama's remarks in the White House Map Room as well as his facial expressions and body movement to serve as reference for the creation and animation of the audio-animatronic. According to Pam Fisher, senior show writer for Imagineering, "it is quite an experience to arrive in the White House and actually be present when the president records his speech for the Hall of Presidents." The Obama version of the attraction opened on July 4, 2009, on the 233rd anniversary of the independence of the United States. Morgan Freeman replaced Hall as narrator for the 2009 revised show, Royal Dano's performance as Abraham Lincoln was restored, and George Washington was added as a third speaking president. The clip of the Saturn V launch was replaced with footage showing the first launch of the Space Shuttle Columbia. This footage had been recycled from the original version of Universe of Energy at Epcot.

Trump administration (2017–2021)
The attraction closed on January 17, 2017 for refurbishment and the addition of President Donald Trump as a new audio-animatronic figure; it reopened on December 19, 2017 after many delays. The film presented is titled The Idea of a President, depicting a historical account of several American presidencies, notably George Washington, Andrew Jackson, Abraham Lincoln, Theodore Roosevelt, Franklin D. Roosevelt and John F. Kennedy. After the roll call of all past presidents, Washington gives a short speech, followed by Trump reciting the oath of office and a short speech.

Biden administration (2021–present)
On January 19, 2021, it was announced that the Hall of Presidents closed for refurbishment, with many media outlets pointing out to the addition of President Joe Biden to the attraction. On July 19, 2021, Disney announced that President Joe Biden would be added to the Hall of Presidents, which reopened on August 3, 2021. The film The Idea of a President, which precedes the roll call of the presidents, was kept for the Biden incarnation. Biden provides his own voice to recite the oath of office following George Washington's speech; however, unlike past versions, Biden delivers no follow-up remarks.

Production

Cast

Transcripts

With the exception of Joe Biden, every sitting president since Bill Clinton has recorded their own remarks for The Hall of Presidents.

In television
The Hall of Presidents is briefly parodied in the segment "FLOTUS, FLOTUS, What Do You Know About Us?" of Season 1 Episode 13 of the 2020 reboot of Animaniacs, where Dot Warner attempts to sing about the First Ladies of the United States, from Martha Washington to Melania Trump, and their accomplishments in under two minutes.

The attraction is also one of various featured in the Disney+ docu-series Behind the Attraction, produced by Dwayne Johnson. The episode dedicated to the attraction was released on August 25, 2021.

Notes
The film used in the show was shot in 70mm format using a special process created by Disney Legend Ub Iwerks. This was also his last project for Disney, before his death in July 1971.
Through George W. Bush, all the presidents were sculpted by Disney Legend Blaine Gibson; Barack Obama's audio-animatronic version was sculpted by his apprentice, Valerie Edwards.
Abraham Lincoln and George Washington are A-100 model Audio-Animatronic figures, a line of the most advanced, lifelike, and expressive human figures that Walt Disney Imagineering has ever built.

See also
 List of Magic Kingdom attractions
 The American Adventure

References

General references
 Birnbaum's Walt Disney World, 2006 Edition, Disney Editions

Inline citations

External links
 Walt Disney World Resort - The Hall Of Presidents

1971 establishments in Florida
Articles containing video clips
Audio-Animatronic attractions
Buildings and monuments honoring American presidents in the United States
Cultural depictions of presidents of the United States
Liberty Square (Magic Kingdom)
Magic Kingdom
Walt Disney Parks and Resorts attractions